Mud Creek is a stream in St. Francois County in the U.S. state of Missouri.

Mud Creek merges with Middlebrook Creek to form the headwaters of Indian Creek. The confluence is just south of the Iron Mountain Lake community and reservoir.

Mud Creek was so named on account of the muddy character of its water.

See also
List of rivers of Missouri

References

Rivers of St. Francois County, Missouri
Rivers of Missouri